Newcastle Airport  is  north of Newcastle, New South Wales ( by road) in Port Stephens. It is the 13th busiest airport in Australia, handling over 1.25 million passengers in the year ended 30 June 2017, an increase of 6.6% on the previous year. The airport occupies a  site on the southern border of RAAF Base Williamtown.

Overview
The airport is jointly owned by Newcastle City Council and Port Stephens Council, and managed by Newcastle Airport Pty Ltd. The airport and associated developments support over 3,300 jobs and contributed $1.19 billion to the economy of the lower Hunter Region in 2015.

The airport runway is owned by RAAF Base Williamtown. Even though this is a military airfield, civilian operations are permitted under an Operating Deed. Jetstar, Virgin Australia and QantasLink operate flights to Sydney, Melbourne, Brisbane, Gold Coast and Ballina. FlyPelican also operates flights to Ballina and Canberra. The airport is leased from the Federal Government for civilian air travel until 2075.

The largest commercial aircraft currently operating at Newcastle Airport are the Boeing 737-800s of Virgin Australia. The civil apron can handle aircraft up to the size of a Boeing 767. The airport runway can handle aircraft up to Boeing 747 size.

History

Commercial operations began at Williamtown in 1947 when the Federal Government opened the existing Royal Australian Air Force (RAAF) airport to civil aviation. The airport remained under government control until 1990 when responsibility for its operation was handed over to Newcastle City Council and Port Stephens Council. The current operator, Newcastle Airport Pty Ltd, was formed by the two councils in 1993.

Scheduled services to the airport commenced in February 1948, with Trans Australia Airlines using Douglas DC-3 aircraft to service a Sydney–Newcastle–Brisbane route. A new passenger terminal was constructed in 1975. During the 1970s, Masling Airlines operated Cessna 402 aircraft on commuter flights between Newcastle and Sydney, and in 1980 with the acquisition of larger Embraer EMB 110 Bandeirante aircraft added a Newcastle – Canberra route. Passenger numbers increased during the 1980s with new airlines and routes serving the airport, including jet services utilising Fokker F28s of Air New South Wales and Ansett Boeing 737s.

Impulse Airlines established a base at the airport in the early 1990s, creating a maintenance facility. In 1994, Impulse added the first direct Newcastle – Melbourne flights to their network utilising British Aerospace Jetstream 41 aircraft. In 1996, owing largely Impulse's establishment of Newcastle as a regional hub, the terminal facilities were upgraded to handle growing passenger volumes. In 2000, Impulse acquired Boeing 717s and rebranded itself as a low-cost carrier. Newcastle Airport remained an integral part of the Impulse route network until the company was bought out by Qantas the following year. Following Qantas' acquisition of Impulse in 2001, the airport became the maintenance base for Jetstar's Airbus A320 fleet. The base also provides third party aircraft maintenance for the QantasLink's Boeing 717s.

In 1997, BAE Systems was awarded the contract for assembly and ongoing system support for the Hawk 127 Lead in Fighters for the RAAF. As part of the contract, a large facility was built adjacent to the passenger terminal at a cost of $15 million. Twenty-one of the thirty three aircraft were assembled at Williamtown, with the final deliveries taking place in October 2001. The BAE facility forms part of the Williamtown Aerospace Centre precinct.

In November 2006, a $8.25 million upgrade to the terminal facilities completed. This development doubled the available floor space in the terminal building, enhanced security screening and added a third departure gate, two baggage carousels and a retail concourse with five stores. In the same year, Jetstar Engineering invested $29 million towards improvements to the former Impulse maintenance facilities to allow heavy maintenance on A320 family aircraft to be conducted at the airport, Aeropelican Air Services moved operations to Williamtown from Belmont Airport and Newcastle Airport was named Regional Airport of the Year by the Australian airports industry. Additional car parking and enhanced set down and pick up landside access was added in 2006 at a further cost of $2.7 million.

On 24 February 2015, Newcastle Airport's a  extension was opened. The new expansion opened the airport to possible international services with a dedicated area for permanent customs, immigration and quarantine facilities. This expansion was the first stage of an $80 million redevelopment, with the existing terminal undergoing a full refurbishment. Redevelopment works for the adjacent RAAF base Williamtown, including a  extension of the shared runway, began in January 2015.

In February 2022, Bonza announced that the airport would become one of its 17 destinations with the airline planning to fly to the Sunshine Coast and Proserpine from Newcastle.

Facilities

Newcastle Airport is surrounded by Class C Airspace and does not have a control tower. Newcastle Airport domestic traffic is controlled by the Williamtown RAAF base. Outside of RAAF operating times and Newcastle Airport operating curfew, pilots must co-ordinate movements using a Common Traffic Advisory Frequency (CTAF). The air traffic control service is provided by RAAF personnel.

Runway 12 is equipped with a Category 1 Instrument landing system incorporating a high intensity approach lighting array to assist aircraft approaching the airport in poor weather conditions. Both ends of the runway are equipped with arrestor wires, although during civil operations, these are not deployed. Aircraft rescue and firefighting services are provided to the airport by the Department of Defence

The terminal building is serviced by a taxi rank. Rental car companies also operate from the precinct. As part of the 2005 upgrades, an information desk was incorporated to provide arriving passengers with facilities to book accommodation, connections and receive information on local attractions. Although the information desk is still located in the arrivals terminal, it is no longer serviced by Newcastle Airport staff. Public internet access is provided. Newcastle Airport is served by bus services operated by Hunter Valley Buses and Port Stephens Coaches.

Previous renovations were completed in 2015 which consisted of refurbishing the existing terminal. A newsagent and specialty gift store was built, as well as six food and beverage outlets. Security screening was relocated to separate the check-in hall from the departures lounge.

Expansion
In May 2021, the Australian Government announced a $55 million upgrade to the international terminal at Newcastle Airport,  The expansion will make the terminal able of facilitating large aircraft capable of flying to Asia, the United States and the Middle East.

In July 2022, Newcastle Airport announced its interest to begin direct flights to Singapore.

Airlines and destinations

Operations

Accidents and incidents
On 2 October 1994, a Rockwell Commander 690B operating for Seaview Air with flight number CD111 departed Newcastle (Williamtown) Airport for Lord Howe Island. The aircraft carried a pilot and 8 passengers. Radio contact with the aircraft was lost during the flight, and a search and rescue operation was declared. Two days later, debris was found floating on the sea near the aircraft's last known position. The Bureau of Air Safety Investigation (predecessor of Australian Transport Safety Bureau) report into the incident uncovered alarming information about how the flight was conducted. The aircraft was 220 kg over maximum takeoff weight, the pilot did not possess a current medical certificate required to operate the aircraft and the company did not have the pre-requisite licences to operate regular public transport flights between Newcastle and Lord Howe Island. The accident is considered not to have been survivable by anyone on board the aircraft. The circumstances surrounding the accident led to a commission of inquiry into the Civil Aviation Safety Authority's handling of Seaview Air's operations.

Notes

References

External links

Airports established in 1947
Airports in New South Wales
Air transport in the Hunter Region
Port Stephens Council
1947 establishments in Australia
International airports in Australia